This article lists the heads of state of Afghanistan since the foundation of the first modern Afghan state, the Hotak Empire, in 1709.

History
The Hotak Empire was formed after a successful uprising led by Mirwais Hotak and other Afghan tribal chiefs from the Kandahar region against Mughal and Safavid Persian rule. 

After a long series of wars, the Hotak Empire was eventually replaced by the Durrani Afghan Empire, founded by Ahmad Shah Durrani in 1747. 

After the collapse of the Durrani Empire in 1823, the Barakzai dynasty founded the Emirate of Kabul, later known as the Emirate of Afghanistan. The Durrani dynasty regained power in 1839, during the First Anglo-Afghan War, when former ruler Shah Shujah Durrani seized the throne under the British auspices. Shah Shujah was assassinated in 1842, following the British retreat. Afterwards the Barakzai dynasty regained power, eventually transformed the Emirate into the Kingdom of Afghanistan in 1926, and ruled the country (with an interruption in 1929) until the last king, Mohammed Zahir Shah, was deposed in the 1973 coup d'état, led by his first cousin Mohammed Daoud Khan. Despite being part of the Barakzai dynasty, Daoud Khan departed from tradition and did not proclaim himself Shah, instead abolished the monarchy and established the Republic of Afghanistan, with himself as President. The Republic lasted until the PDPA–led Saur Revolution in 1978.

Since 1978, Afghanistan has been in a state of continuous internal conflict and foreign interventions.

President Hamid Karzai became the first ever democratically elected head of state of Afghanistan on 7 December 2004. His successor, Ashraf Ghani, was in power from 29 September 2014 to 15 August 2021, when he fled the country as Kabul fell to the Taliban following its 2021 offensive.

Upon its recapture of Kabul, the Taliban reinstated the Islamic Emirate of Afghanistan, and its supreme leader since 2016, Islamic scholar Hibatullah Akhundzada, de facto succeeded Ghani as head of state.

List of heads of state

(Dates in italics indicate de facto continuation of office)

Monarchs

Hotak Empire (1709–1738)

Durrani Empire (1747–1823)

Emirate of Kabul / Emirate of Afghanistan (1823–1926)

Kingdom of Afghanistan (1926–1929)

Saqqawist Emirate and the 1928–1929 civil war

Kingdom of Afghanistan (restored; 1929–1973)

Local monarchs
Some rulers tried to take advantage of internal conflicts in Afghanistan to claim the throne. However, their rule was limited only to certain areas.

Non-monarchs

Family tree of monarchs

Timeline from 1880

Standards of heads of state

See also
 President of Afghanistan
 Supreme Leader of Afghanistan
 Prime Minister of Afghanistan
 Chief Executive (Afghanistan)
 Politics of Afghanistan
 History of Afghanistan
 List of Pashtun empires and dynasties
 Name of Afghanistan
 Afghan (ethnonym)

Notes

References

External links
 Presidency of Afghanistan (15 August 2021 archive)

Afghanistan

Heads of state
Heads of state
Heads of state